Marky Ramone & the Speedkings was founded in 2001.   The band recorded a studio album which first came out in Europe/Argentina and Japan as No If's, And's or But's.  Each of these releases featured different tracks as a bonus. It got then released in the USA as Legends Bleed in September 2002 and featured live tracks. The band did several European tours as well as a Japan and US tour, the latter of which ended in 2003.
They released several singles, including "I've Got Dee Dee On My Mind" in memory of Dee Dee Ramone. A live album, Alive, was recorded and released on Rawk'A Hula Records.

Band members
Nick Cooper Decock (vocals)
Dee Jaywalker (guitars/Vocals)
Glen Meyer (bass)
Marky Ramone (drums)

References

External links
Dee Jaywalker Official Site

American punk rock groups
Musical groups established in 2001
Ramones